Herbert Lorentz Brede (25 April 1888 in Püssi – 6 October 1942 in Norilsk) was an Estonian soldier and general.

Brede fought in World War I as an officer of the Imperial Russian Army against the Central Powers. After World War I he fought against the Red Army in the Estonian War of Independence.

After Estonia was occupied by the Soviet Union, he was transferred to the Soviet Army. When Germany invaded Estonia in June 1941, he was arrested by NKVD and sent to Norillag prison camp, where he was executed the next year.

References

1888 births
1942 deaths
People from Püssi
People from Kreis Wierland
Estonian major generals
Soviet major generals
Imperial Russian Army officers
Russian military personnel of World War I
Estonian military personnel of the Estonian War of Independence
Recipients of the Cross of Liberty (Estonia)
Recipients of the Military Order of the Cross of the Eagle, Class I
Recipients of the Military Order of the Cross of the Eagle, Class II
Recipients of the Military Order of the Cross of the Eagle, Class III
Recipients of the Order of Lāčplēsis, 3rd class
Estonian people executed by the Soviet Union
Norillag detainees